The 2011 Italian Census is the fifteenth and most recent Italian national census. The reference day used for the census was October 9, 2011. The population was counted at 59,433,744.

A census of the whole population has taken place in Italy every 10 years since 1861.

References

Censuses in Italy
Census
Italy